The Botswana Fed Cup team represents Botswana in Fed Cup tennis competition and are governed by the Botswana Tennis Association.  They have not competed since 2006.

History
Botswana competed in its first Fed Cup in 1995.  Their best result was fourth place in its Group II pool in 2002 and 2003.

Tapiwa Marobela has recorded the highest number of wins for the Botswana Fed Cup team, six wins from 13 singles matches and two wins from 11 doubles matches between 2001 and 2004, before she attended Florida State University from 2004 to 2008.

See also
Fed Cup
Botswana Davis Cup team
Botswana Tennis Association

References

External links

Billie Jean King Cup teams
Fed Cup
Fed Cup